Igor Valeryevich Chugainov (born 6 April 1970) is a Russian football coach and a former defender.

Club career
He played mostly for FC Lokomotiv Moscow, FC Torpedo Moscow and finally for FC Uralan Elista.

International
He played for Russia national football team for which he amassed 26 caps and was a participant at the 2002 FIFA World Cup. In 1992 Chugainov had already appeared for the CIS team but wasn't selected for the EURO 1992 squad.

Honours
Russian Cup
Winner (5): 1993, 1996, 1997, 2000, 2001

References

External links
 Profile at RussiaTeam 
 
 
 RFS profile 

1970 births
Living people
Footballers from Moscow
Soviet footballers
Russian footballers
FC Torpedo Moscow players
FC Torpedo-2 players
FC Lokomotiv Moscow players
2002 FIFA World Cup players
Russian football managers
Russia international footballers
Russian Premier League players
Dual internationalists (football)
FC Elista players
FC Khimki managers
Soviet Top League players
Russian Premier League managers
FC Torpedo Moscow managers
FC Sokol Saratov managers
FC Sibir Novosibirsk managers
FC Novosibirsk managers
Association football defenders